The Segovii (Gaulish: *Segouioi, 'the victorious, powerful') were a Gallic tribe dwelling in the Alpes Cottiae, around present-day Cesana Torinese and Montgenèvre, during the Iron Age.

Name 
They are attested as Segoviorum on the Arch of Susa.

The ethnonym Segovii is a latinized form of Gaulish *Segouioi. It derives from the root sego-, meaning 'victory, force'. It is comparable with the feminine forms Segouia (Segovia) and Segauias (now Göfis).

Geography 
The Segovii dwelled around the towns of Gaesao/Tyrium (modern Cesana Torinese) and Druantium (Montgenèvre; also named *Alpis Cottia and Summae Alpes). Their territory was located south of the Belaci, north of the Brigianii and Quariates, and east of the Ucenni. The settlement of Ad Fines (modern Fenils) may have been the border between the territories of the Segovii and Belaci.

History 
They are mentioned on the Arch of Susa, erected by Cottius in 9–8 BC.

References

Bibliography 

Historical Celtic peoples
Gauls
Tribes of pre-Roman Gaul
Ancient peoples of Italy